Campbelltown is a suburb located on the outskirts of the metropolitan area of Sydney, New South Wales, Australia. Campbelltown is the administrative seat of the local government area of the City of Campbelltown. It is also acknowledged on the register of the Geographical Names Board of New South Wales as one of only four cities within the Sydney metropolitan area.

Campbelltown gets its name from Elizabeth Campbell, the wife of former Governor of New South Wales Lachlan Macquarie. Originally called Campbell-Town, the name was later simplified to the current Campbelltown.

History
The area that later became Campbelltown was inhabited prior to European settlement by the Tharawal people. Not long after the arrival of the First Fleet in Sydney in 1788, a small herd of six cattle escaped and weren't seen again by the British settlers for seven years. They were spotted, however, by the Tharawal people. In a rock art site called Bull Cave near Campbelltown, they drew a number of cattle with pronounced horns. The Tharawal described the cattle to British explorers and in 1795 the British found a herd of around 60 cattle grazing in the area now known as Camden.

The colonial administration was keen for the herd to establish itself so forbade killing of the cattle or settlement in the area. But John Macarthur, who wanted to establish sheep in the colony, took a liking to the prime grazing land. He convinced the British government to overrule the local administration and grant him  just south of the Nepean River in 1805. Four years later a number of other grants were made to farmers between Camden and Liverpool.

The Tharawal initially worked with the local farmers but a drought in 1814 led to large numbers of neighbouring Gandangara people moving into the area in search of food. Tensions developed between the British and the Gandangara leading to skirmishes and a number of deaths on each side. Governor Macquarie felt a permanent settlement would lead to order in the area and so Campbell-Town was born in 1820.

Town development

Development of the town was slow particularly after the departure of Macquarie, and it wasn't until 1831 that residents took possession of town land. However, it was during this period that Campbelltown's most famous incident occurred. In 1826, local farmer Frederick Fisher disappeared. According to folklore, his ghost appeared sitting on a fence rail over a creek just south of the town and pointed to a site where his body was later found to be buried. In memory of the incident, the Fisher's Ghost festival is held each November in Campbelltown.

Campbelltown's population increased steadily in the decades following. The southern rail line was extended to Campbelltown in 1858, leading to further development, and in 1882, Campbelltown Council was established allowing municipal works to occur in earnest. Campbelltown became the first country town in New South Wales to have piped water in 1888 and in the period between the World Wars, a local power station was built to supply electricity to residents.

Campbelltown was designated in the early 1960s as a satellite city by the New South Wales Planning Authority, and a regional capital for the south west of Sydney. There was extensive building and population growth in the intervening time and the government set aside land surrounding the township for public and private housing and industry.

Geography

Climate 
Campbelltown has a humid subtropical climate (Köppen climate classification: Cfa) with mild to cool winters and warm to hot summers.

Commercial area

The old town centre, as laid down by Lachlan Macquarie, is still the main commercial area and includes the Queen Street shopping strip, Campbelltown Mall, Campbelltown railway station and bus interchange, the council chambers and a number of historic buildings. The main residential area is to the south and east of the town centre. On the northwestern side of the railway line is an industrial area.

To the southwest is a second commercial area based around Macarthur railway station which includes the University of Western Sydney and Macarthur Square, a large shopping mall. It features an outdoor entertainment and restaurant precinct known as "Kellicar Lane" which opened after an expansion in November 2005. It features a food court that has large glass windows that look over Kellicar Lane, Campbelltown and the surrounding countryside.

Heritage listings 

Campbelltown has a number of heritage-listed sites on the New South Wales State Heritage Register, including:
 Broughton Street: St John's Catholic Church, Campbelltown
 8 Lithgow Street: Glenalvon House
 14 - 20 Queen Street: Warbys Barn and Stables
 261 Queen Street: Campbelltown Post Office
 263 Queen Street: Commercial Banking Company of Sydney, Campbelltown Branch (former)
 284 - 298 Queen Street: Queen Street Buildings
 303 Queen Street: Dredges Cottage

The following additional buildings in central Campbelltown are listed on the (now defunct) Register of the National Estate.
 St Peter's Church of England, Cordeaux Street
 Richmond Villa, 12 Lithgow Street
 Town Hall, 315 Queen Street
 Campbelltown Court House, Queen Street
 Campbelltown Police Station, Railway Street
 Graves of Matthew Healey, James Ruse, Cemetery, George and Broughton Streets

Transport

Campbelltown lies on the main road and rail links from Sydney to the south-west. The Hume Motorway links Campbelltown north to Liverpool, Sydney Airport and Sydney CBD and south to Goulburn and Canberra.

Campbelltown railway station and Macarthur railway station are on the Airport & South Line of the Sydney Trains network. Campbelltown is also the northern terminus of most Southern Highlands Line intercity services.

Campbelltown is also well serviced by buses. Busabout provides a number of services from Campbelltown Station to virtually all the surrounding suburbs of Campbelltown as well as to Camden. Interline provides a service from Campbelltown to Glenfield and Picton Buslines provides a service from Campbelltown to Picton via Camden.

Health

Campbelltown Hospital is part of the South Western Sydney Local Health District and is located on the southern edge of the suburb near Ambarvale. Campbelltown Private Hospital is located nearby and with the Centric building constitute a close-knit, combined public-private-consulting rooms complex within a convenient radius at Park Central.

Campbelltown Hospital is a major metropolitan hospital. Its emergency department is one of the busiest in Sydney, equipped with 32 beds and will expand further with the redevelopment of the hospital. The hospital has a wide range of surgical specialties, including general surgery (and its subspecialties of Breast & Endocrine surgery and Colorectal Surgery), orthopaedic surgery, ENT surgery, ophthalmology (i.e., eye surgery), etc. Breast cancers, thyroid and parathyroid diseases, as well as colonic and rectal cancers are particularly well served by the hospital, with its surgeons managing high volumes of these diseases at both Campbelltown public and private hospitals. The Macarthur Cancer Therapy Centre is a dedicated facility providing radiotherapy, chemotherapy and multidisciplinary cancer care to the local residents

Bed capacity is currently at 340 during peak times, with a planned addition of 90 beds with the current redevelopment (stage 1), bringing it up to 430 beds by the end of 2015. The new hospital block with an additional 90 beds is nearing completion with planning of the next major stage of redevelopment already underway (stage 2). It has a well-equipped intensive care (ICU) and high dependency unit (HDU) with the ability to support ventilated and critically ill patients. The hospital is well supported by a radiology department with services including ultrasounds, CT scans as well as a state-of-the-art MRI scanner

Education

The Western Sydney University (old name University of Western Sydney) has a Campbelltown Campus, located on Narellan Road. It was established from 1983 as the second campus of the Macarthur Institute of Higher Education, which merged into WSU in 1989.

There are a number of local schools, including:
 Campbelltown Performing Arts High School
 Broughton Anglican College
 Campbelltown Public School
 Campbelltown East Public School
 Campbelltown North Public School
 St Patricks College Campbelltown
 John Therry Catholic High School
 St John the Evangelist Catholic Primary
 St Peter's Anglican Primary
 Robert Townson High School
 Mount Carmel Catholic College
 Robert Townson Public School
 Kearns Public School
 Blairmount Public School
 Claymore Public School
 Eaglevale High School
 Leumeah Public School
 Leumeah High School
 Rosemeadow Public School
 Ambarvale High School
 Sarah Redfern High School 
 Sarah Redfern Public School
 Minto Public School 
 The Grange Public School 
 Campbellfield Public School 
 Al Faisal College
 St. Peter's Anglican Primary School (Campbelltown) 
 Airds High School
 Woodland Road Public School

In the surrounding suburbs are a number of other schools associated with Campbelltown such as Broughton Anglican College, Mount Carmel High School (Varroville), Thomas Reddall High School (Ambarvale), Ambarvale High School (Rosemeadow), Menangle Park, and St Gregory's College, Campbelltown which is located in its own suburb, Gregory Hills.

Housing
The residential area has a combination of public and privately owned housing. Public housing estates are scattered across the region and the neighbouring areas.

Population
According to the 2016 census of Population, there were 12,566 people in the suburb of Campbelltown, and 157,006 residents in the Campbelltown Local Government Area.

In the suburb of Campbelltown, 
 Aboriginal and Torres Strait Islander people made up 4.5% of the population. 
 62.4% of people were born in Australia.  The most common countries of birth were England 3.4%, New Zealand 3.2%, Philippines 2.4%, India 2.1% and Sri Lanka 1.2%.
 75.4% of people only spoke English at home. Other languages spoken at home included Arabic 2.9%, Samoan 1.8%, Mandarin 1.4%, Tagalog 1.4% and Spanish 1.3%. 
 The most common responses for religion were Catholic 25.2%, No Religion 20.8%, and Anglican 15.8%.

Notable residents
 Samantha Azzopardi – Con artist
 Mark Binskin – Chief of the Australian Defence Force
 Nicole Callisto – BMX cyclist; born in Joondalup, Western Australia, now resides in Campbelltown
 Tim Campbell – Former Home and Away actor and TV host
 Michael Plicha – Award-winning international media executive; resided in Campbelltown from birth to the age of 13
 Paula Denyer (born Paul Charles Denyer) – Serial killer
 Bronwyn Eagles – Six time women's hammer throw champion
 Nathan Foley – Former Hi-5 member
 Jarryd Hayne – Australian rugby league, rugby union and gridiron footballer athlete
 Brett Hodgson – Former Wests Tigers captain and current head coach of the Western Suburbs Magpies
 Trent Hodkinson – Australian rugby league footballer
 Ryan Hoffman – Australian rugby league footballer
 Mark Hunt – New Zealand mixed martial arts fighter
 Krisnan Inu – New Zealand rugby league footballer
 Alanna Kennedy – Footballer for The Matildas, Manchester City and Sydney FC
 Emcee Kerser – Australian rapper
 Joseph Leary – Former Australian solicitor, politician and Member of the Lower House.
 Peter Fitzallan MacDonald – Australian pastoralist, entrepreneur and politician.
 John Marsden – Lawyer, appointed Member of the Order of Australia
 Trent Peoples – Australian rugby league footballer
 Jim Piper – Australian breaststroke swimmer
 Bruce Quick – Olympic shooter
 Kate Ritchie – Australian actress and Gold Logie winner
 James Ruse – Early settler and farmer; Ruse, New South Wales named after him
 Yvonne Strahovski – Star of US TV series Chuck and The Handmaid's Tale
 Jai Waetford – X Factor finalist
 Lisa Wilkinson – The Project co-host on the Network 10
 William Hardy Wilson – Architect, artist and author; regarded as "one of the most outstanding architects of the twentieth century"

Culture

The Arts

The Campbelltown Arts Centre, situated just south of the main town centre features a 180-seat performance space, exhibition galleries and workspaces. Outside is a sculpture garden and a Japanese Gardens and Teahouse that was a gift from Campbelltown's sister city Koshigaya in Japan.

Fisher's Ghost Festival
The Fisher's Ghost Festival is an annual festival held in recognition of Frederick Fisher, an emancipated convict who owned farming land in Campbelltown. Legend has it that Fisher appeared to local man John Farley as a ghost after being murdered by George Worrall, his friend and neighbour, over a land dispute. An annual parade through Campbelltown's main street, Queen Street, is held each November, and a carnival including fairground rides and other entertainment is held at Bradbury Oval, a local sports ground. Over a period of two weeks many activities take place, including the Fisher's Ghost Fun Run, the Fisher's Ghost Art Award and the Street Party which was formerly known as the Mardi Gras.

Media
Campbelltown is home to two local radio stations, 2MCR and C91.3FM. The two local newspapers are the Campbelltown-Macarthur Advertiser and the Macarthur Chronicle.

Sport and recreation
Campbelltown is very well known for its strong sporting culture. This includes Rugby League, Cricket, Athletics, Soccer and Australian Rules Football. Campbelltown has produced many professional athletes who have represented Australia at Olympic level.
Its leading sporting team is the Wests Tigers who play in the National Rugby League competition. The Wests Tigers are a merger of two foundation clubs of the old New South Wales Rugby League premiership, the Western Suburbs Magpies and the Balmain Tigers. As such, they play some of their home games at Campbelltown Stadium in neighbouring Leumeah and others at Leichhardt Oval in inner-western Sydney. The Magpies still exist as a stand-alone team in the lower-tier competition, the New South Wales Cup, and play home games at Campbelltown Stadium.

Macarthur FC played their first season in the A-League Men in late 2020, after they were awarded a license under the name "Macarthur South-West Sydney" in December 2018 as part of the league's expansion. The club will play their home games at Campbelltown Stadium.

Another tenant of Campbelltown Stadium is the Macarthur Rams soccer team which plays in the New South Wales Premier League competition. Campbelltown is represented in the Sydney Grade Cricket competition by the Campbelltown-Camden Ghosts who play their home games in Raby and in the Sydney AFL's Premier Division, by the Campbelltown Blues who play their home games in Macquarie Fields. The Campbelltown District Netball Association, based in Minto, plays in the third division of the Netball NSW State League.

References

External links

 Campbelltown City Council website
 2001 Census Information
 2006 Census Information

 
Suburbs of Sydney
Towns in the Macarthur (New South Wales)
Cities in New South Wales
Populated places established in 1820